Ministry of Finance of the Turkish Republic of Northern Cyprus (Kuzey Kıbrıs Türk Cumhuriyeti Maliye Bakanlığı), is the ministry in North Cyprus responsible for government finance.

Ministers of Finance
Rüstem Z. Tatar, August 1974 - July 1976
Mehmet Altinay, July 1976 - December 1976
Mustafa Çağatay, December 1976 - July 1977
Tansel Fikri, July 1977 - April 1978
Hüseyin Erdal, April 1978 - December 1978
Hakkı Atun, December 1978 - August 1981
Salih Coşar, August 1981 - July 1985
Taşkent Atasayan, July 1985 - September 1986
Mehmet Bayram, September 1986 - June 1990
Nazif Borman, June 1990 - March 1992
Salih Coşar, March 1992 - January 1994
Onur Borman, January 1993 - January 1995
Salih Coşar, January 1995 - December 1998
Mehmet Bayram, December 1998 - January 2004
Ahmet Uzun, January 2004 - May 2009
Ersin Tatar, May 2009 - June 2013
Zeren Mungan, June 2013 - July 2015
Hasan Başoğlu, July 2015 - October 2015
Birikim Özgür, October 2015 - April 2016
Serdar Denktaş, April 2016 - May 2019
Olgun Amcaoğlu, May 2019 - December 2020
Dursun Oğuz, December 2020 -
Source:

See also
Government of Northern Cyprus
Central Bank of the Turkish Republic of Northern Cyprus
Economy of Northern Cyprus

References

Government of Northern Cyprus
Economy of Northern Cyprus
Northern Cyprus